Alberto Pascual Garrido (born 28 September 1974), known as Pascual Garrido, is an Argentine former professional footballer who played as a left-back.

External links
 

1974 births
Living people
Association football fullbacks
Argentine footballers
Argentine expatriate footballers
Expatriate footballers in France
Ligue 1 players
Scottish Premier League players
Boca Juniors footballers
SC Bastia players
U.S. Triestina Calcio 1918 players
Dundee F.C. players
Rangers de Talca footballers
Expatriate footballers in Italy
Expatriate footballers in Scotland
Expatriate footballers in Chile
Expatriate footballers in Spain
Argentine expatriate sportspeople in France
Argentine expatriate sportspeople in Italy
Argentine expatriate sportspeople in Spain
Argentine expatriate sportspeople in Scotland
Footballers from Buenos Aires